Arabi El Goni (January 1, 1920 in Abeche, Chad – October 22, 1973) was a politician from Chad who served in the French National Assembly from 1956-1958.

References 
 page on the French National Assembly website

1920 births
1973 deaths
People from Ouaddaï Region
Chadian politicians
National Centre of Social Republicans politicians
Deputies of the 3rd National Assembly of the French Fourth Republic
Deputies of the 1st National Assembly of the French Fifth Republic
Chadian expatriates in France